A gubernatorial election was held on 8 April 2007 to elect the Governor of Saga Prefecture. Incumbent Yasushi Furukawa was re-elected.

Candidates
 Yasushi Furukawa – incumbent Governor of Saga Prefecture, age 48
 – Communist Party Committee Chairman, age 59

Results

References

Saga gubernatorial elections
2007 elections in Japan